The Manitoba Soccer Association (MSA) is the governing body for soccer in the Canadian province of Manitoba. The association was formed March 19, 1896 in Brandon, MB.

The MSA is a member of the national governing body, the Canadian Soccer Association.

The MSA's Vision Statement is: "A thriving and dynamic soccer community throughout Manitoba, supported and enabled by a framework that is built on collaboration and partnership and unified in its pursuit of opportunities to grow and develop the sport."

The MSA's Mission Statement is: "To provide objective governance and leadership for the sport across the province, to lead the soccer community to develop and implement a long-term plan for the development of all aspects of soccer in Manitoba, to act as the primary advocate and ambassador for the sport of soccer in Manitoba, and to lead member organizations in providing efficient and comprehensive soccer programming across Manitoba."

Board of Directors 

Terms end in November, with ending year shown in brackets.

John Baker, President (2021)
Angela Worthman, Vice President (2021)
Andrew Carvalho, Treasurer (2023)
Jana-Rae Brunel (2021)
Keith Driedger (2022)
Jane Froese (2022)
Pablo Szajt (2022)
Ramona Rohringer (2023)
Linton Sellen (2023)

Staff Members 
Héctor Vergara, Executive Director
Chris Lourenco, Technical Lead
Joanne Sutherland, Finance & Administration Manager
Tim Kozakewich, Member Services Manager
Andrew Kliment, Grassroots Manager
Rochelle Dziadekwich, Technical Manager
Brad McMechan, Programs Manager

Annual Meetings and Presidents (1886-1960)
March 19, 1896  J. Shoemaker.
March 6, 1897, S. Shoemaker.
March 4, 1898, D.M. Duncan.
May 25, 1899, H. Irwin.
April 13, 1900, H. Irwin.
April 5, 1901, F.L. Davis.
April 17, 1902. Edward Loftus.
April 16, 1903, Edward Loftus.
April 21, 1904, Edward Loftus.
April 13, 1905, Edward Loftus.
April 12, 1906, C.W. St. John.
April 11, 1907, C.W. St. John.
April 9, 1908, D.M. Duncan.
April 8, 1909, C.W. St. John.
April 2, 1910, C.W. St. John.
April 7, 1911, Sam Larkin.
April 12, 1912, Sam Larkin.
April 18, 1913, E. Bailey Fischer.
April 3, 1914, E. Bailey Fisher.
April 2, 1915, E. Bailey Fisher.
April 7, 1916,  John Easton.
April 6, 1917,  John Easton.
April 5, 1918, John Easton.
April 4, 1919, John Easton.
April 2, 1920, John Easton.
April ?, 1921,  John Easton.
April 7, 1922,  John Easton.
April 6, 1923, John Easton.
April 5, 1924,  John Easton.
April 3, 1925,  John Easton.
March 20, 1926, John Easton.
March 19, 1927, Jack Baillie.
March 17, 1928,  Jack Baillie.
March 16, 1929, Jack Baillie.
March 15, 1930, Jack Baillie.
March 21, 1931, Jack Baillie.
............, 1932,  John Colvin.
March 18, 1933, John Colvin.
March 17, 1934, Jimmy Wardrope.
March 16, 1935, Jimmy Wardrope.
March 21, 1936,  Jimmy Wardrope.
March 20, 1937,  Jimmy Wardrope.
March 19, 1938, Dan Shepherd.
March 18, 1939, Hugh Boyd.
1940 to 1945 Years of World War II
Oct 28, 1946, Bob Harley,
Nov 2, 1947, Bob Harley.
Oct 31, 1948, Bob Harley.
Oct 30, 1949/Jan 29, 1950, Ed Watt.
Oct 29, 1950, Dr. Victor Hagen.
Oct 28, 1951, Dr. Victor Hagen.
Oct 26, 1952, Dr. Victor Hagen.
Oct 31, 1953, Dr. Victor Hagen.
Nov 7, 1954, Alex Alexander.
Nov 6, 1955, Vince Butterworth.
Nov 4, 1956. Percy Gillatt.
Oct 24, 1957, Percy Gillatt.
Oct 25, 1958, Ernie Draffin.
Oct 25, 1959, Ernie Draffin.
Oct 30, 1960, Ernie Draffin.

References

External links
 Manitoba Soccer Association - Official website

 
Soccer governing bodies in Canada
1896 establishments in Manitoba
Soccer
Sports organizations established in 1896